Girl from Hong Kong is a 1961 West German romance film directed by Franz Peter Wirth and starring Hanns Lothar, Helmut Griem and Akiko Wakabayashi.

The film's sets were designed by the art directors Hans Berthel and Johannes Ott.

Cast
 Hanns Lothar as Kuddel Bratt
 Helmut Griem as Glenn Dierks
 Akiko Wakabayashi as Anna Suh
 Carla Hagen as Martha
 Ursula Lillig as Geesche
 Carl Lange as Knut Ohlsen
 Peter Carsten as Volkert
 Eva Pflug as Gudrun
 Maria Martinsen
 Klaus Kindler as Fleez
 Wilhelm Groothe
 Li Min as Lili Kwong
 Hela Gruel
 Karl-Heinz Kreienbaum
 Peter Thom
 Herta Fahrenkrog
 Helga Feddersen
 Erika Tweer
 Willem Fricke
 Marga Maasberg
 Charles Palent
 Chi Lin as Lee Yong
 Michiko Tanaka

References

Bibliography

External links 
 

1961 films
West German films
German romantic drama films
1961 romantic drama films
1960s German-language films
Films directed by Franz Peter Wirth
Films produced by Seymour Nebenzal
Films scored by Michel Michelet
Bavaria Film films
Films based on German novels
1960s German films